Samuel Joseph may refer to:

 Samuel Joseph (Australian politician) (1824–1898), New South Wales colonial politician
 Samuel Joseph (gridiron football) (born 1983)
 Samuel Joseph (sculptor) (1791–1850)
 Sir Samuel Joseph, 1st Baronet (1888–1944)

See also